True20 is a role-playing game system designed by Steve Kenson and published by Green Ronin Publishing. The system was first published as a part of the Blue Rose RPG before being published as a standalone universal generic role-playing game, True20 Adventure Roleplaying.

History
The True20 system was originally used in Green Ronin's Blue Rose, itself based on their Mutants & Masterminds RPG. Later that year, Green Ronin released a PDF distillation of the Blue Rose rules, with an appendix of some modern-era rules, as a generic form of the game. This was followed by an expanded hardcover release in 2006. A revised softcover rulebook, combining the rules section of the True20 Adventure Roleplaying book with the True20 Companion was released April 25, 2008.

Settings
The original setting for the system was the Blue Rose in which the system first saw print. In its generic role-playing game, the original hardcover printing of the True20 Adventure Roleplaying book included four sample settings. These were chosen among publisher submitted setting with the winners announced in Dragon Magazine:
 "Caliphate Nights", a fantasy version of the golden age of Islam, circa 800 AD. A full-color standalone hardcover was released for the setting at Origins 2006.
 "Lux Aeternum", a swashbuckling space opera.
 "Mecha vs. Kaiju", in which giant robots protect Japan from giant monsters.
 "Borrowed Time", a setting of Kung Fu action and gunplay against a backdrop of time-controlling conspiracies.

The Revised Edition has four different settings:
 Fantasy Adventures
 Space Adventures
 Horror Adventures
 Modern Adventures

A follow up volume, True20 Worlds of Adventure includes five additional settings:
 "Agents of Oblivion"
 "Blood Throne"
 "Land of the Crane", an Asian fantasy setting.
 "Nevermore"
 "Razor in the Apple", a horror setting in which kids face monsters lurking the neighborhood, inspired by films such as The Goonies.

System
Utilizing the Open Gaming License, True20 is derived from Wizards of the Coast's d20 System. Differences from the parent game include the following:
 There are only three character classes, referred to as roles: warrior, adept and expert.
 A single 20-sided die is used for each roll.
 Ability scores are given as simple modifiers (+1, +2, etc.) rather than as a statistic in the range from 3-18 (which in some other systems, such as d20, would then be converted to simple modifiers).
 There are no class-specific or restricted skills, thus characters of any role can have any skill.
 New feats are available at each level.
 Magic spells are treated as feats and do not have "levels".
 Instead of hit points, characters simply experience "damage conditions" like that of Mutants & Masterminds.
 Instead of experience points, characters automatically increase in level at the Narrator's discretion, usually after one or two adventures.

Licenses and third-party products 

Since before its release, the True20 system has been open to users under the terms of the Open Gaming License. To use the True20 logo though required a separate license and license fee purchased from Green Ronin. Several companies have taken advantage of this to produce their own True20 titles. On April 12, 2008, Chris Pramas of Green Ronin Publishing announced a new, free licensing agreement with third-party publishers to produce True20 products. Details were posted on the company's website and forums, and met with praise from publishers, freelancers and players alike.

Reviews
Pyramid

See also
 Blue Rose
 Mutants & Masterminds - True20's damage mechanics are shared with this game.

References

 Steve Kenson True20 Adventure Roleplaying (Green Ronin Publishing, 2006) 
 Various Authors True20 Worlds of Adventure (Green Ronin Publishing, 2006)

External links
Official website

Universal role-playing games
D20 System
Green Ronin Publishing games
Role-playing game systems
Role-playing games introduced in 2005